Rigmor Stenmark (born 1940) is a Swedish Centre Party politician, member of the Riksdag 1994–2006. She was elected to the Riksdag from Uppsala County constituency and had a seat of 71. During her time in the Riksdag, Stenmark was a member in residential Committee 1995 - 2006 and during different periods alternate member of the Defense Committee, the Agriculture Committee, the Committee on Justice, Legal Affairs Committee and Social Committee.

References

1940 births
Living people
Members of the Riksdag 1994–1998
Members of the Riksdag 1998–2002
Members of the Riksdag 2002–2006
Members of the Riksdag from the Centre Party (Sweden)